Junker is a noble honorific, derived from Middle High German , meaning 'young nobleman' or otherwise 'young lord' (derivation of  and ). The term is traditionally used throughout the German-speaking, Dutch-speaking and Scandinavian-speaking parts of Europe. It was also used in the Russian Empire due to Baltic German influence, up until the Russian Revolution. The term is currently still in use by the Georgian Defense Forces for student officers of the National Defence Academy.

Honorific title
In Brandenburg, the Junker was originally one of the members of the higher Edelfrei (immediate) nobility without or before the accolade. It evolved to a general denotation of a young or lesser noble, sometimes politically insignificant, understood as "country squire".

Martin Luther disguised himself as "Junker Jörg" at the Wartburg; he would later mock King Henry VIII of England as "Juncker Heintz".

As part of the nobility, many Junker families only had prepositions such as von or zu before their family names without further ranks. The abbreviation of the title was Jkr., most often placed before the given name and titles, for example: Jkr. Heinrich von Hohenberg. The female equivalent Junkfrau (Jkfr.) was used only sporadically. In some cases, the honorific Jkr. was also used for Freiherren (barons) and Grafen (counts).

Usage
Junker (and its cognates) was traditionally used as a noble honorific throughout the German-speaking parts of Europe. The title today survives in its traditional meaning in the Netherlands and Belgium in the Dutch form Jonkheer.

The term was also used in several countries in the title Kammerjunker, the German and Scandinavian equivalent of the French valet de chambre, a position usually given to young noble men in the service of a princely rank person at the court. A Kammerjunker was ranked below a chamberlain, but above a chamber page. It has also been used in military roles in the German and Scandinavian realm, such as Fahnenjunker and its Scandinavian equivalents (for instance: fanjunkare).

In Denmark, the term Junker connotes a young lord, originally the son of a medieval duke or count, but also a term for a member of the privileged landowner class. Before 1375 the honorific was also suitable for Danish royal sons. It was also used in the title Kammerjunker within the royal household.

Modern popular usage in Prussia

In modern Prussian history, the term became popularly used as a loosely defined synecdoche for the landed nobility (particularly of so-called East Elbia) who controlled almost all of the land and government, or by extension, the Prussian estate owners regardless of noble status. With the formation of the German Empire in 1871, the Junkers dominated the central German government and the Prussian military. A leading representative was Prince Otto von Bismarck. "The Junkers" of Prussia were often contrasted with the elites of the western and southern states in Germany, such as the city-republic of Hamburg (which had no nobility) or Catholic states like Bavaria, in which the "Junker class" of Prussia was often viewed with contempt. After World War II, the junker class, which had formed much of the officer corps of the Wehrmacht and whose prominent member President and former General Paul von Hindenburg had appointed Hitler chancellor in 1933, was often blamed for Prussian militarism, the rise of the Nazis and World War II. As a consequence, a land reform in the Soviet Occupation Zone which had the goal of collectivization along Soviet lines was justified in propaganda as a strike against the Junker class with the slogan "Junkerland in Bauernhand" (junker lands in peasant hands).

Modern usage in Russia

See also
Dutch nobility
German nobility
Jonkheer
Yonkers

References

German words and phrases
German noble titles